The Orion Experience (occasionally abbreviated to T.O.E.) is an American pop rock band formed in New York City in 2005 by singer/songwriter Orion Simprini and Linda Horwatt (Linda XO). The band has released three studio albums and two EPs, and their music has been featured on television shows such as Laguna Beach, The Hills, Victorious, iCarly, and Zoey 101. The name "The Orion Experience" is a "self-effacing" reference to other bands like The Alan Parsons Project and The Steve Perry Project. The band’s gender-fluid themes and presentation have attracted a strong LGBTQ+ fanbase.

History 
In 2006, The Orion Experience released their first studio album, Cosmicandy, on Sweet! Records. In 2007, the band performed at Fearless Music, and in early 2008, Perez Hilton called the song "Obsessed With You" "an indie pop gem ... double yum." The same song was also featured in the 2019 thriller The Honeymoon Phase.

Their 2008 EP release, Heartbreaker, was produced by Maroon 5 producer Jon Kaplan. In 2009, the band released Cosmicandy in Japan and included all four songs from Heartbreaker, as well as a new track called "Nippon Ga Dai Suki (Japan We Love You!)".

Their second EP, NYC Girl, was released on April 19, 2011. USA Today described the title track as a "string-infused disco-pop ditty" reminiscent of "70s-era Electric Light Orchestra".

In October 2012, the band put on an immersive theater show at Dixon Place in Manhattan's Lower East Side with the "idea to make a rock concert that brought fantasy back to live music." The following year, the band created an off-Broadway show called The Orion Experience, which opened in August 2013 at XL Nightclub. The show was directed by Travis Greisler, produced by Ryan Bogner, and choreographed by Misha Shields. The cast featured Simprini, Horwatt, Reef Rox, and Honey Davenport as the Queen of White Lies. The show was accompanied by their second full-length album, Children of the Stars, which includes expanded versions of the songs from the live theater productions.

In 2014, the band recorded the single "Rich Man's Holiday". In the following years, both lead singers Simprini and Horwatt wrote and produced solo albums. Horwatt recorded the album Stupid Love and the self-titled EP Linda XO. Simprini produced his EP Lush Life and other singles.

Due to a rise in online popularity in 2019 and 2020, the band reestablished itself and began releasing more music. In January 2021, the band released Sugar Deluxe, a compilation album that combined the Heartbreaker EP and the NYC Girl EP, and included two previously unreleased tracks, "How the Story Ends" and "Lower East Side Love Song", while removing the track "Nice Guys Finish Last". The band's third studio album, Fever Dream, was released on October 22, 2021. In 2022, Cosmicandy and Children of the Stars were reissued on vinyl, CD, and cassette by Needlejuice Records, but these were later hidden from their website on September 1, 2022, and removed completely in December 2022. All unsold copies were destroyed.

Discography

Studio albums

Extended plays

Compilation albums

Singles

References

External links
The Orion Experience on YouTube
The Orion Experience on Bandcamp
The Orion Experience website

American pop music groups
Musical groups from New York City
Musical groups established in 2005